Pieter Stephanus "Piet" du Toit, (9 October 1935 – 26 February 1996) was a South African rugby international. He played as a prop. Due to his relative small stature and light weight for a prop, but still being a strong scrummager, he was known as Piet "Spiere" du Toit. Spiere is the Afrikaans word for "muscles".

Career
He then also made his Test debut for the Springboks as a Boland player.

He played his first test match on 26 July 1958 against France in a historic series for les Bleus. He was later chosen for a series of four matches against the All Blacks, and helped the Springboks to two wins, one draw, and one defeat.

In 1960–61 he was selected for five games with the Springboks, who embarked on a tour of Europe. He helped beat Wales 3–0. He also participated in victories against Ireland 8–3 as well as over England 5-0 and Scotland 12–5. On 18 February 1961 the South Africans drew in Paris 0–0.

Piet du Toit also took part in three victories over the Irish and Australia in 1961 to end his international career.

Test history

Personal life
Piet completed his schooling at Paarl Boys' High School. Du Toit graduated from the University of Stellenbosch with a B. Comm degree. In 1957, Piet du Toit and his wife Barbara, a teacher, started farming on the Kloofenburg Wine Estate near Riebeek Kasteel, Western Cape which his father and father in law bought in 1956. Piet retired in 1989 and his son, Pieter du Toit, still farms on this estate. Two of his grandsons, Johan du Toit and Pieter-Steph du Toit, also plays professional rugby. Pieter-Steph has already followed in his grandfather's footsteps by becoming a Springbok.

See also

List of South Africa national rugby union players – Springbok no. 332

References

External links
 Photo and portrait at Springboks site- see 1960

South African rugby union players
Rugby union props
1935 births
1996 deaths
South Africa international rugby union players
Western Province (rugby union) players
Boland Cavaliers players
Rugby union players from the Northern Cape